Pârâul Rău may refer to the following rivers in Romania:

 Pârâul Rău, a tributary of the Ghimbav in Argeș County
 Pârâul Rău, a tributary of the Ilișoara Mare in Mureș County
 Pârâul Rău, a tributary of the Olteț in Gorj County
 Pârâul Rău, a tributary of the Târzia in Neamț County